Quakertown is an unincorporated community in Harmony Township, Union County, in the U.S. state of Indiana.

History
Quakertown was known as Millboro until 1866.

A post office was established at Quakertown in 1866, and remained in operation until it was discontinued in 1903.

Geography

References

Unincorporated communities in Union County, Indiana
Unincorporated communities in Indiana